Andre Charles may refer to:

Andre Charles (artist) (born 1968), American artist
André Charles Boulle (1642–1732), French cabinetmaker
André-Charles Cailleau (1731–1798), French book publisher